The 2020 Women's Beach Handball World Championships would have been the ninth edition of the tournament. Originally scheduled for 30 June to 5 July 2020 in Pescara, Italy, the tournament was planned to be rescheduled and moved to another host country, due to the COVID-19 pandemic.

On 22 February 2021, the tournament was cancelled.

Qualification

References

External links
Official website 

Beach World Championships
Beach Handball World Championships
Women's Beach Handball World Championships
B